Living Life Golden is the second studio album by Swedish singer Elliphant, released on 25 March 2016 by TEN Music Group and Kemosabe Records. The album was previously scheduled to be released on 25 September 2015.

Track listing

Notes
  signifies a co-producer

Charts

References

2016 albums
Albums produced by Cirkut
Albums produced by Dave Sitek
Albums produced by Diplo
Albums produced by Dr. Luke
Albums produced by Joel Little
Elliphant albums
Kemosabe Records albums
TEN Music Group albums